is a former Japanese football player.

Club statistics

References

External links

1986 births
Living people
Association football people from Osaka Prefecture
Japanese footballers
J2 League players
Japan Football League players
Mito HollyHock players
Fukushima United FC players
YSCC Yokohama players
Association football midfielders